Mount Cohen is a peak,  high, standing  southwest of Mount Betty in the Herbert Range, Queen Maud Mountains. It was discovered by R. Admiral Byrd on several Byrd Antarctic Expedition plane flights to the Queen Maud Mountains in November 1929, and named by him for Emanuel Cohen of Paramount Pictures, who assisted in assembling the motion-picture records of the expedition.

References 

Mountains of the Ross Dependency
Dufek Coast